Hong Nam-ki (born 29 July 1960) is a former Minister of Economy and Finance and a Deputy Prime Minister of South Korea served under President Moon Jae-in from 2018 to 2022. He is the longest serving Minister of Economy and Finance and Deputy Prime Minister of the country. He previously served as an acting Prime Minister from April to May 2021.

Hong is considered a veteran technocrat working at mostly at budget-related departments under both conservative and liberal governments for over three decades. Before promoted to President Moon's second finance minister, Hong was his first Minister for Government Policy Coordination (OPC) and previously president Park Geun-hye's vice minister for now-Ministry of Science and ICT.

His nomination as President Moon's next finance minister was strongly recommended by then-Prime Minister Lee Nak-yon whom Hong closely worked for as Minister for Government Policy Coordination. Hong's predecessor, Kim Dong-yeon, also served as the head of OPC under previous administration before appointed as Moon's first finance minister.

As of December 2020, Hong is also one of four people who continue to serve President Moon as cabinet minister or ministerial-level government official from the beginning of Moon's presidency in 2017 along with Kim Sang-jo, Suh Hoon, and Kang Kyung-wha.

Policy Stances 
On several occasions, Hong expressed his disapproval of adopting Universal basic income as it only significantly worsens fiscal responsibility without effectively replacing the current social safety net and for this reason it is not adopted by any countries in the world.

After the government and the ruling party led by Lee concluded not to lower the taxation threshold for "a large shareholder" from 1 billion won to 300 million won worth of stocks in a single company upon strong opposition from the both sides of the political parties, Hong submitted his resignation reasoning that "someone had to take responsibility on the debate that lasted for two months and on the current status of not lowering the threshold." President Moon immediately rejected his resignation and reaffirmed him citing that he is the right person to lead Korea's economic recovery from the COVID-19 pandemic. In response to two petitions calling for Hong's removal from office due to this "shareholder issue," the Blue House reiterated that Hong and the government have committed themselves in economic recovery.

In January 2021, Hong reiterated his stance on fiscal responsibility in response to growing discussions on the possible fourth covid-19 relief and financial assistance to businesses affected by the pandemic. Although Korea's debt-to-GDP ratio is relatively low compared to other developed countries, cumulative debt, according to Hong, is a burden to the future generations. He also emphasised that government spending is not a "widow's cruise" and therefore must be spent wisely even in this pandemic. Moreover, in an interview, he expressed his willingness to actively participate in such discussions as he has a solemn duty as the country's finance minister to "guard the storehouse (meaning country's budget)." Even on his last day as the minister, he reiterated the importance of maintaining fiscal soundness of the country.

Education
Hong graduated from Hanyang University with a bachelor degree in economics and MBA. He also holds a master's degree in economics from University of Salford via Korean government fund for its employees' tertiary education in foreign countries.

References

External links 

Minister of Economy and Finance

Living people
1960 births
People from Chuncheon
Hanyang University alumni
Alumni of the University of Salford
Deputy Prime Ministers of South Korea
Finance ministers of South Korea
Government ministers of South Korea
Economy ministers